Saturday Night Revue is a 1937 British musical film directed by Norman Lee and starring Billy Milton, Sally Gray and John Watt.

Cast

References

Bibliography
 Low, Rachael. Filmmaking in 1930s Britain. George Allen & Unwin, 1985.
 Wood, Linda. British Films, 1927-1939. British Film Institute, 1986.

External links

1937 films
British musical films
1937 musical films
1930s English-language films
Films directed by Norman Lee
Films set in London
Films shot at Welwyn Studios
British black-and-white films
1930s British films